Yanchi Town is a town located at the northern part of Mentougou District, Beijing, China. It borders Liucun Town and Huailai County to its north, Miaofengshan and Wangping Towns to its east, Datai Subdistrict to its south, and Zhaitang Town to its west. It was home to 5,160 people in 2020.

The name Yanchi originated in the Yuan dynasty, and was named after a local mountain which shaped like wild goose's wings.

History

Administrative Divisions 
As of 2021, Yanchi Town consisted of 24 subdivisions, where 1 was a residential community and the rest were villages:

See also 

 List of township-level divisions of Beijing

References 

Mentougou District
Towns in Beijing